St Mary the Virgin's Church, West Stockwith is a Grade II* listed parish church in the Church of England in West Stockwith, Nottinghamshire, England.

History

The church dates from 1722 and was built for William Huntington.

It is part of a joint parish with:
All Saints' Church, Beckingham
All Saints' Church, Misterton
St Mary Magdalene's Church, Walkeringham
St Peter & St Paul's Church, Gringley on the Hill
St Peter's Church, Clayworth

Organ

The organ dates from 1906 by Jubb of Gainsborough. A specification of the organ can be found on the National Pipe Organ Register.

References

Churches completed in 1722
Church of England church buildings in Nottinghamshire
Grade II* listed churches in Nottinghamshire
1722 establishments in England